The 1999 North Somerset Council election took place on 6 May 1999 to elect members of North Somerset Unitary Council in Somerset, England. The whole council was up for election with boundary changes since the last election in 1995 increasing the number of seats by 2. The Conservative Party gained overall control of the council from no overall control.

Election result

References

1999 English local elections
1999
1990s in Somerset